Woodridge Local School District is a public school district in Northeast Ohio, covering most of Peninsula and parts of Akron and Cuyahoga Falls.  The Board of Education and administrative offices are located at 4411 Quick Road, Peninsula, Ohio 44264.

Administration
 Superintendent: Walter Davis
 Treasurer: Tom Morehouse

Schools
Woodridge High School 
Principal: Albert DiTommaso
Woodridge Middle School 
Principal: Jesse Hosford
Woodridge Elementary School
Principal: Beth Harrington

External links

School districts in Summit County, Ohio